The Uptown Residential Historic District, in Lumpkin, Georgia, is a  historic district which was listed on the National Register of Historic Places in 1982.

It includes several blocks of wood-framed residences and two churches along Main Street, Broad Street, Cherry Street and Chestnut Street in Lumpkin, with a few properties on Florence Street and Pine Street.  The majority of the houses are one-story, but there are five two-story ones.

References

Historic districts on the National Register of Historic Places in Georgia (U.S. state)
National Register of Historic Places in Stewart County, Georgia
Greek Revival architecture in Georgia (U.S. state)
Victorian architecture in Georgia (U.S. state)
Neoclassical architecture in Georgia (U.S. state)